Shamwari Game Reserve is located 75 km outside Port Elizabeth (now Gqeberha), Eastern Cape, South Africa. It has been voted the World's Leading Safari and Game Reserve and Conservation Company for several consecutive years.

An essential focus is the management, development and rehabilitation of an ecosystem that has been returned to a more natural condition after many years of agricultural farming.

Awards and honors 
In 2005 the reserve was awarded the Global Nature Fund Award for Best Conservation Practice.

In popular culture
It was the subject of the 2018 Netflix reality TV series Shamwari Untamed.

The British TV series of Safari School was filmed here. The Animal Planet series titled "Shamwari: A wild life" was also filmed at the game reserve. The show highlighted what goes on behind the scenes at the reserve.

Partner organizations
The Born Free Foundation jointly funds a sanctuary at Shamwari that gives lifetime care to several lions and leopards that have been discovered in poor conditions in circuses or zoos around the world. They have two centres on the reserve, one in the north and one in the south.

References

External links
 Shamwari's Website
 Born Free Foundation

Protected areas of the Eastern Cape
Nature reserves in South Africa